This list focuses on published authors whose working-class status or background was part of their literary reputation. These were, in the main, writers without access to formal education, so they were either autodidacts or had mentors or patrons. This lack of standardized education gave rise to the notion of the "rough," "untutored," "natural" artist. There was a vogue among middle- and upper-class readers, particularly later in the eighteenth-century and throughout the Romantic era, for writers with an "interesting story of genius-in-rags," for "the Unschooled Sons" — and daughters — "of Genius."

Writers

Notes

Resources
Andrews, Corey E. "'Work' Poems: Assessing the Georgic Mode of Eighteenth-Century Working-Class Poetry." Experiments in Genre in Eighteenth-Century Literature. Ed. Sandro Jung. Ghent, Belgium: Academia Press, 2011, pp. 105—133. 
Ashraf, Mary. Introduction to Working-Class Literature in Great Britain. Two vols. East Berlin, 1978.
Basker, James G., ed. Amazing Grace: An Anthology of Poems about Slavery 1660-1810. New Haven and London: Yale University Press, 2002.
Batt, Jennifer. "Eighteenth century labouring-class writing." Great Writers Inspire. University of Oxford, 24 May 2012. Accessed 24 August 2022. 
Blair, Kirstie, and Mina Gorji, eds. Class and the Canon: Constructing Labouring-Class Poetry and Poetics, 1780-1900. London: Palgrave Macmillan, 2013.  
Boos, Florence S. "The Poetics of the Working Classes." Victorian Poetry, vol. 39, no. 2, 2001, pp. 103–10. JSTOR. Accessed 24 Aug. 2022.
Christmas, William J. The Lab'ring Muses: Work, Writing, and the Social Order in English Plebeian Poetry, 1730–1830.
Evans, Gareth. "British Working Class and Socialist Writing: A Bibliography of Critical Material." The Radical Teacher Issue:48 (1996-04-30):17 
Ferguson, Moira. Eighteenth-century women poets: nation, class, and gender. Albany: State University of New York Press, 1995.    
 Goodridge, John, Simon Kövesi, David Fairer, Tim Burke, William Christmas, and Bridget Keegan, eds. Eighteenth-Century English Labouring-Class Poets, 1700–1740, 3 vols. Routledge, 2003.   
 Goodridge, John, and Bridget Keegan, eds. A History of British Working Class Literature. Cambridge University Press, 2017.  
 Goodridge, John. "Labouring-Class Poetry." Teaching Romanticism. Teaching the New English. Eds. D. Higgins and S. Ruston. London: Palgrave Macmillan, 2010, pp.11-23.  
 Hall, Edith, and Henry Stead. "18th-century working-class poets." A People’s History of Classics. Routledge, 2020. 
Harvey, A.D.. "Working-Class Poets and Self-Education." Contemporary Review. May 1999.
Heinzelman, Kurt. "The Uneducated Imagination: Romantic Representations of Labor." At the Limits of Romanticism: Essays in Cultural, Feminist, and Materialist Criticism. Ed. Mary A. Favret and Nicola J. Watson. Bloomington, Indiana: Indiana University Press, 1994, 101-24.
 Hudson, Nicholas. "Literature and Social Class in the Eighteenth Century." Oxford Handbook Topics in Literature (online edn,Oxford Academic, 16 Dec. 2013). Accessed 23 Aug. 2022.
Keegan, Bridget. British Labouring-Class Nature Poetry, 1730-1837. London: Palgrave Macmillan, 2008.   
Klaus, H. Gustav. The Literature of Labour: 200 Years of Working-Class Writing. Brighton: Harvester, 1985.
Kord, Susanne. Women peasant poets in eighteenth-century England, Scotland, and Germany: milkmaids on Parnassus. Rochester, N.Y.: Camden House, 2003.   
Donna Landry. "The Labouring-Class Women Poets: Hard Labour we most chearfully pursue." Women and Poetry, 1660-1750. Eds. Sarah Prescott and David Shuttleton. Houndmills: Palgrave Macmillan, 2003, pp. 223-43.
Landry, Donna. The Muses of Resistance: Laboring-Class Women's Poetry in Britain, 1739-1796. Cambridge University Press, 1990  (Open Access at Internet Archive)
Murphy, Paul Thomas. Toward a working-class canon: literary criticism in British working-class periodicals, 1816-1858. Columbus: Ohio State University Press, 1994.   
Niepytalska, Marta, "Anne Milne on 'British Eighteenth-Century Laboring-Class Poets.'" Carson Fellow Portraits. Directed by Alec Hahn. Filmed May 2011. MPEG video, 3:41. .
Scrivener, Michael. "Laboring-Class Poetry in the Romantic Era." A Companion to Romantic Poetry 2012, pp.234-250. 
Scrivener, Michael. Poetry and reform : periodical verse from the English democratic press, 1792-1824. Detroit: Wayne State University Press, 1992.   
Southey, Robert. The Lives and Works of Our Uneducated Poets. Ed. J.S. Childers. London: Oxford University Press, 1925. First pub. as Attempts in Verse, by John Jones, an Old Servant; with Some account of the Writer, Written by Himself; and an Introductory Essay on the Lives and Works of Uneducated Poets, by Robert Southey, Esq., Poet Laureate (London, 1831).
Williams, John. "Displacing Romanticism: Anna Seward, Joseph Weston and the Unschooled Sons of Genius." Placing and Displacing Romanticism. Ed. Peter J. Kitson. London: Ashgate, 2001, 48-59.

See also
Abolitionism in the United Kingdom
Captivity narrative
Education Act
History of education in England
Pastoral
Political poetry
Proletarian literature
Romanticism
Slave narrative
Slavery in the British Isles

External sites
Labouring-class poets online
Labouring-class poets online bibliography

Lists of writers
18th-century writers
History of literature